Chile is a signatory to the Vienna Convention on Road Signs and Signals, and therefore its signs are compliant with international standards. Chile uses yellow diamonds for warning signs in common with most of the rest of the Americas. Speed limit signs are a red circle with a white background and the limitation in black, and are in kilometres per hour. There are also some signs unique to Chile. Chile also currently uses a mixture of both types of mandatory signs.

Chile drives on the right.

Formerly, Highway Gothic was the official typeface of Chile's road signs. New Chilean road signs use Ruta CL, a font designed for Chile's road signs.

Road signs

Priority signs
The priority section includes three signs: Give Way, Stop, and Stop for Children. The give way sign indicates to drivers that they must slow down and give way to vehicles on the approaching road, but that they do not need to stop if there is enough room to join or merge. The stop sign indicates to drivers that they must come to a complete stop before joining the approaching road, and is reserved for situations where a raised risk of an accident exists if drivers were not to fully stop before proceeding. The stop for children sign is used by crossing guards, and indicates to drivers that they must come to a complete stop and wait while children cross the road.

Prohibitory signs
The prohibition section includes signs that are used to prohibit and limit certain vehicles from using the road or from making certain movements/actions. Prohibitions are indicated by a red circle with a 45 degree slash from left to right.

Restriction signs
The restriction section includes signs that are used to limit the use of the road based on certain characteristics of the road itself, such as limited height. This section also includes the "end of prohibition or restriction" sign which marks the end of any prohibitions and restrictions of the road.

Mandatory signs
The obligation section includes signs directing road users to directions and actions they must take or obey. This includes marking one-way streets, mandatory turns and lane control.

Permission signs
The authorization section includes signs informing road users of actions that are allowed.

Warning signs

Intersection signs

Special signs

Temporary signs

Informative Signs

References

Chile